Noise Ninja is a proprietary noise reduction application and Photoshop plugin which attempts to eliminate noise present in photos taken with a digital camera. It uses custom profiles for each camera to increase the effectiveness of the noise reduction algorithms used.

Noise Ninja's development was discontinued when Photo Ninja was introduced.

References

MacOS graphics-related software
Photo software
Windows graphics-related software